Would I Lie to You? (informally abbreviated as WILTY; also known as Would I Lie to You? America or Would I Lie to You? USA) is an American comedy panel game show based on the British game show of the same name. It premiered on April 9, 2022 on The CW.

Format
In all rounds, the scoring system is the same: teams gain a point for correctly guessing whether a statement is true or not, but if they guess incorrectly the opposing team gets a point. 

 "Home Truths": Panelists read out a statement about themselves. The opposing team must ask the panelist questions to decide if the statement is true or false.

 "This is My...": A guest comes onto the set and is introduced by first name, but remains standing in silence as the round continues. Panelists on one team tell the opposing team about their connection to the guest; only one account out of three told is true, and the opposing team has to work out which it is. At the end of the round, the guest reveals their true identity, and which of the panelists they have a genuine relationship with.

 "Quick-Fire Lies": The second questioning round, with the panelists chosen at random.

Production
On March 8, 2021, it was announced that The CW had ordered the series. On December 9, 2021, Aasif Mandvi was announced as host of the show, with Matt Walsh and Sabrina Jalees serving as team captains. The series premiered on April 9, 2022.

Episodes

Reception

References

External links

2020s American comedy game shows
2022 American television series debuts
American panel games
American television series based on British television series
The CW original programming
English-language television shows
Television series by Banijay
Television series by CBS Studios